MES Institute of Technology and Management is a self-financing engineering college under APJ Abdul Kalam Technological University, established in 2009. The college is located at Kollam District near Thirumukku, Chathannoor, Kerala.

References
http://www.mesitam.ac.in

External links
 Official website

Private engineering colleges in Kerala
Colleges affiliated to the University of Kerala
Engineering colleges in Kollam
Educational institutions established in 2009
2009 establishments in Kerala